Donji Viduševac  is a village in Croatia.

Religion

Roman Catholic Chapel of Jesus' Heart
Roman Catholic Chapel of Jesus' Heart was heavily damaged in 1991 during the Croatian War of Independence. It was entirely reconstructed only after the end of war.

References

External links

Populated places in Sisak-Moslavina County
Glina, Croatia